The 1993 Copa de Oro Finals was a two-legged football series to decide the champion of the 1993 Copa de Oro organised by CONMEBOL. It was contested by Argentine side Boca Juniors and Brazilian Atlético Mineiro in July 1994. 

Boca Juniors (as 1992 Copa Master champion) had previously eliminated São Paulo (1–0 on aggregate) while Atlético Mineiro (as 1992 Copa Conmebol champion) had beaten Cruzeiro on penalties in their roads to the final.

The first was held in Mineirão Stadium in Belo Horizonte, where both teams tied 0–0. In the second leg, held in La Bombonera in Buenos Aires, Boca Juniors beat Cruzeiro 1–0 to claim their first Copa de Oro title.

Qualified teams

Venues

Match details

First leg

Second leg

References

1993
1993 in Brazilian football
o
o
1993 in South American football